The 1932–1933 SM-sarja season would become the last one played as a Cup series. The season also had the smallest number of participating teams as there was 4 teams from 2 cities.

Semifinals 

HSK and HJK advance to Final.

Final 

Helsingfors Skridskoklubb wins the 1932–33 SM-sarja championship.

References
 Hockey Archives

Liiga seasons
1932–33 in Finnish ice hockey
Fin